Cristina Martínez Arrieta (born 8 October 1972 in San Sebastián) is a Spanish slalom canoeist who competed at the international level from 1990 to 1996.

Competing in two Summer Olympics, she earned her best finish of 17th in the K1 event in Barcelona in 1992.

References

1972 births
Canoeists at the 1992 Summer Olympics
Canoeists at the 1996 Summer Olympics
Living people
Olympic canoeists of Spain
Spanish female canoeists
20th-century Spanish women